is a Japanese actor and model.

Filmography

Theatre

Television

Film

Japanese dub

References

External links
 
 

21st-century Japanese male actors
Amuse Inc. talents
Japanese male musical theatre actors
Japanese male stage actors
Japanese male child actors
Japanese male television actors
Living people
1995 births